The Free Trade Union of Workers of the Kingdom of Cambodia (FTUWKC) is a trade union in Cambodia. It was founded in December, 1996. ICTUR reports that the largest activities of the FTUWKC are in the garment industry.

Chea Vichea, president of the FTUWKC, was murdered in January, 2004.

References

Trade unions in Cambodia
Trade unions established in 1996
Organisations based in Phnom Penh